Parasnath Yadav (12 January 1949 – 12 June 2020) was an Indian politician and was elected  7 times MLA in Legislative Assembly of Uttar Pradesh, 3 times Minister in Government of Uttar Pradesh and 2 times Member of Parliament  from Jaunpur. He was suffering from bladder cancer for many years, eventually he died on the 12 June 2020 at his residence in Jaunpur district, Uttar Pradesh. He had a problem with Prostate. He went to Mumbai for treatment. He was undergoing treatment at Kokilaben dhirubhai ambani Hospital. He had returned to Jaunpur from Mumbai and after few days he died due to the Corona.

Early life and education
Paras Nath Yadav was born 12 January 1949 in Barsathi  Jaunpur district of Uttar Pradesh to his father Shree Ram Yadav. He married  Hirawati Devi in 1970, who was also on post of Block Pramukh of Barsathi till his death (2016). They have three sons and one daughter. He attended Sewashram Inter College Suriyawan, Varanasi and attained Intermediate Certificate.

On 12 June 2020, he died aged 71 at his house in the Jaunpur district of Uttar Pradesh due to Bladder cancer.

Political career
Yadav started his journey in politics in 9th Legislative Assembly of Uttar Pradesh (1985) elections, he got ticket by Lok Dal from Barsathi (Assembly constituency). He contested and was elected MLA  defeating INC's Rama Krishna by a margin of 6,008 (9.38℅) votes. He was also a Member in Public Enterprises and Corporation Joint Committee (1987-1988) and Question and Reference Committee (1988-1989).

In second term, in 10th Legislative Assembly of Uttar Pradesh (1989) elections, he was elected MLA for a second time continuously by defeating INC's Lakshmi Shankar Yadav by a margin of 11,276 (12.23℅) votes. He was appointed  Minister of State for Secondary Education in Mulayam Singh Yadav ministry. In 1991 elections, he left Lok Dal and joined Janata Party. He again contested from Barsathi but lost to BJP's Raghuraj and stood on third with 14,686 (17℅) votes. In 1992, when Mulayam Singh Yadav founded the Samajwadi Party, Yadav also left the Janata Party and joined the Samajwadi Party. From then till his death he remained associated with Samajwadi Party. He was the closest leader to Mulayam Singh Yadav.

In his third Legislature term, in 12th Legislative Assembly of Uttar Pradesh (1993) elections, he got ticket by Samajwadi Party from Barsathi and he was elected MLA. Their  winning margin also increased over time, he defeated his nearest candidate INC's Shachindra Nath Tripathi by a huge margin of 41,843 (31.85℅) votes.

In his fourth Legislature term, in the 13th Legislative Assembly of Uttar Pradesh (1996) elections, the Samajwadi Party did not give him a ticket from his regular assembly and gave him a ticket from Mariyahu (Assembly constituency). He was also not harmed by changing the assembly constituency and he defeated BJP's Jagannath Rao by a margin of 11,518 (9.04℅) votes and was elected MLA. He was also made a member of the "Joint Committee on Scheduled Castes, Scheduled Tribes and Scheduled Castes" (1997–1998).

In 12th Lok Sabha (1998) elections, the Samajwadi Party made him its candidate from Jaunpur (Lok sabha constituency) in the middle of his fourth Legislative term. He contested against contemporaneous MP BJP's Raj Keshar Singh. He defeated Raj Keshar Singh by a margin of 13,426 (1.92℅) votes and was elected MP of Jaunpur. They also contested 13th Lok Sabha (1999) elections, but lost to BJP's Swami Chinmayanand by a close margin of 8,635 (1.25℅) votes.

In his fifth Legislature term, in the 14th Legislative Assembly of Uttar Pradesh (2002) elections, he again contested from Mariyahu and defeated his nearest candidate Barkhu Ram Verma (Independent) by a margin of 7,077 (5.16℅) votes. In 2003, after the fall of the BSP government, when Mulayam Singh Yadav became the Chief Minister, he also got a place in the cabinet with portfolios of Animal Husbandry. In 14th Lok Sabha (2004) elections, despite being a minister, the Samajwadi Party again gave him a ticket from Jaunpur (Lok Sabha Constituency). He was elected second time MP of Jaunpur by defeating BSP's Om Prakash Dubey alias Baba Dubey by a margin of 27,125 (3.80℅) votes. He was also made a member of several committees of Parliament. He also contested 15th Lok Sabha (2009) elections, but lost to BSP's Dhananjay Singh by a margin of 80,381 (10.52℅) votes.

In his sixth Legislature term, in the 16th Legislative Assembly of Uttar Pradesh (2012) elections, Samajwadi Party gave him ticket from newly created Malhani (Assembly constituency). He defeated Independent candidate Dr Jagriti Singh (wife of Dhananjay Singh) by a huge margin of 31,502 (16.28℅) votes and was elected MLA of Malhani. After the elections, the Samajwadi Party government was formed and Akhilesh Yadav became the new Chief Minister of Uttar Pradesh. He was also appointed Cabinet Minister in Akhilesh Yadav ministry with portfolios of Minor Irrigation and Animal Husbandry. In 16th Lok Sabha (2014) elections, despite being a minister, Samajwadi Party again made him its candidate from Jaunpur (Lok Sabha Constituency). He contested election but lost in Modi wave, he lost to BJP's Krishna Pratap Singh and stood on third with 1,80,003 (17.87℅) votes.

In his last or seventh Legislature term, in 17th Legislative Assembly of Uttar Pradesh (2017) elections, he again contested from Malhani. He defeated NISHAD Party candidate Dhananjay Singh by a margin of 21,210 (10.30℅) votes and was elected MLA. In June 2020, during the tenure of his seventh legislature, he died by Bladder cancer. He continued to serve the people of Jaunpur till his death.

Posts held

References

External links
 Parasnath Yadav's website 

1949 births
2020 deaths
People from Uttar Pradesh
People from Jaunpur, Uttar Pradesh
India MPs 2004–2009
Uttar Pradesh MLAs 2017–2022
Samajwadi Party politicians
India MPs 1998–1999
Uttar Pradesh MLAs 2012–2017
Uttar Pradesh MLAs 2002–2007
Uttar Pradesh MLAs 1997–2002
Deaths from the COVID-19 pandemic in India